Debina or Dębina may refer to:

Places in Poland

Greater Poland Voivodeship 
 Dębina, Gniezno County 
 Dębina, Gostyń County
 Dębina, Koło County
 Dębina, Szamotuły County
 Dębina, Wągrowiec County
 Dębina, Września County
 Dębina, a park and neighbourhood in the Wilda, Poznań

Lesser Poland Voivodeship 
 Dębina, Lesser Poland Voivodeship

Łódź Voivodeship 
Dębina, Łask County
Dębina, Sieradz County
Dębina, Wieluń County
Dębina, Wieruszów County
Dębina, Gmina Kleszczów
Dębina, Gmina Kutno
Dębina, Gmina Rusiec
Dębina, Gmina Strzelce

Lower Silesian Voivodeship 
Dębina, Lower Silesian Voivodeship

Lublin Voivodeship 
Dębina, Chełm County
Dębina, Hrubieszów County
Dębina, Kraśnik County
Dębina, Włodawa County
Dębina, Gmina Strzyżewice
Dębina, Gmina Tyszowce
Dębina, Gmina Ulhówek
Dębina, Gmina Zakrzew

Masovian Voivodeship 
Dębina, Masovian Voivodeship

Opole Voivodeship 
Dębina, Olesno County
Dębina, Prudnik County

Podlaskie Voivodeship 
Dębina, Podlaskie Voivodeship

Pomeranian Voivodeship 
Dębina, Kościerzyna County
Dębina, Malbork County
Dębina, Słupsk County
Dębina, Tczew County
Dębina, Wejherowo County

Subcarpathian Voivodeship 
Dębina, Subcarpathian Voivodeship

West Pomeranian Voivodeship 
Dębina, West Pomeranian Voivodeship

Other uses 
 Debina (grape), a Greek wine grape
 Debina Bonnerjee (born 1973), Indian actress